HD 117939 is a Sun-like star in the southern constellation of Centaurus. With an apparent visual magnitude of 7.29 it is too faint to be viewed with the naked eye, but is within the range of binoculars or a small telescope. It is located at a distance of 98.5 light years from the Sun based on parallax measurements, and is drifting further away with a radial velocity of +82 km/s.

An ordinary G-type main-sequence star with a stellar classification of G4V, this star is an "excellent photometric match for the Sun"; the atmospheric properties of the star make it a near solar twin. It is older than the sun at 6.1 billion years, but is more chromospherically active.

To date no exact solar twin (precisely matching all important properties of the Sun) has been found. However, there are some stars that come very close to being identical to the Sun, and as such are dubbed solar twins by astronomers. An exact solar twin would be a 4.6 billion years old G2V star with a 5,778K temperature, the correct metallicity, and a 0.1% solar luminosity variation. G2V stars with an age of 4.6 billion years or more have typically reached their most stable state. Proper metallicity and size are also important to low luminosity variation.

Sun comparison
Chart compares the sun to HD 117939.

See also 
 List of nearest stars

References

G-type main-sequence stars
Solar analogs

Centaurus (constellation)
Durchmusterung objects
9450
117939
066238